The Oregon Trail was a historic migration route across the western United States.

Oregon Trail may also refer to:

Art, entertainment, and media

Films

 The Oregon Trail (1923 serial)
 The Old Oregon Trail (film), a 1928 American western directed by Victor Adamson (as Denver Dixon)
 The Oregon Trail (1936 film), starring John Wayne
 The Oregon Trail (1939 serial)
 Oregon Trail (film), a 1945 Sunset Carson Western
 The Oregon Trail (1959 film), starring Fred MacMurray

Games
 The Oregon Trail (series), a series of educational computer games
 The Oregon Trail (1971 video game), a text-based strategy video game
 The Oregon Trail (1985 video game), an educational computer game by MECC based on the 1971 video game
 The Oregon Trail (2009 video game), the 2009 iOS and DSiware version of the 1985 video game
 The Oregon Trail (2011 video game), the 2011 version of the 1985 video game
 The Oregon Trail (card game), by Pressman Toy Corporation, based on the video game of the same name
 Oregon Trail (board game), 1981

Television
The Oregon Trail (TV series), 1977
"The Oregon Trail", an episode from the eleventh season of the ABC News program What Would You Do?
Miracle Workers: Oregon Trail, the third season of the 2019 series Miracle Workers

Other
 The Oregon Trail, a 2015 play by Bekah Brunstetter
 The Oregon Trail: Sketches of Prairie and Rocky-Mountain Life (1849), an influential history by Francis Parkman

Other uses
 Oregon Trail Council, a unit of the Boy Scouts of America
 Oregon Trail Junior High School, a school in Kansas
  Oregon Trail Generation, a neologism for those born during GenerationX/Millennial cusp years

See also
 Trail, Oregon, a US census-designated place